Jowzi (also Romanized as Jowzī) is a village in Kushk Rural District, in the Central District of Bafq County, Yazd Province, Iran. At the 2006 census, its population was 12, in 5 families.

References 

Populated places in Bafq County